The Senior Secondary Certificate of Education (SSCE) is the graduation certificate awarded to most students in Australian high schools, and is equivalent to the Advance Placement in North America and the GCE A-Levels of the United Kingdom. Students completing the SSCE are usually aged 16 to 18 and study full-time for two years (years 11 and 12 of schooling). In some states adults may gain the certificate through a Technical and Further Education college or other provider.

The curriculum, assessment and name of the SSCE is different in each state and territory. The government of each determines these themselves, although the curriculum must address mutually agreed national competencies.

Universities Australia generates a nationally standardised final score for each SSCE exam student called the Australian Tertiary Admission Rank (ATAR). Universities and other Higher Education providers typically use this mark as the main criterion in selecting domestic students. Most States and Territories in Australia uses the ATAR system with the exemption of Queensland. Queensland has its own ranking system called Overall Position (OP).

See also

References

Australian Certificate of Education
Secondary school qualifications